SAI or  is a lightweight raster graphics editor and painting software for Microsoft Windows developed and published by Systemax Software. Development of the software began on August 2, 2004, and the first alpha version was released on October 13, 2006. SAI's official release (1.0.0) was on February 25, 2008, and an update preview was released shortly after. It has been available on Microsoft Windows from 98 to 10.

The painting application is available in both Japanese, and an official English as well as an official German translation.

Features

SAI is a lightweight painting application. The user interface allows multiple documents to be opened at the same time. The drawing canvas can be both zoomed and rotated using the sliders on the navigator or the hotkeys configured on the keyboard. The toolbar on the top part of the screen also includes a button to mirror the drawing view without mirroring the actual drawing. It is also possible to open multiple viewports to the same document. An application-wide scratchpad (which can be used as a color mixing panel) is provided, which is saved between sessions. Colors can be stored in the swatches panel.

Various raster drawing tools are implemented, such as the Airbrush, Watercolor, Pen, and Marker, which can all be easily customized, and stored in slots in the user interface of the application. There is also a set of vector drawing tools intended for inking, which, like the raster tools, can be configured to be pen pressure-sensitive.

Work can be done on separate layers, which can be grouped and have opacity masks. In addition to this, layers can be masked by clipping them to a lower layer. This allows one to add shading and highlights to an area without creating new masks for the additional layers.

There is also a pen movement and pressure smoothing feature which can be manually configured as to how much effect it has.

Selection tools include the simple square selection, the lasso, and magic wand, which can be configured for anti-aliasing. There is also a selection brush tool, which can be customized like the drawing brush.

SAI comes with a full set of transformation tools that can work on selections, including move, resize, rotate, and a free (perspective) transform. Any series of transforms can be set up and then applied at once to a specific selection minimizing the softening of the image.

Some common features that exist in similar software, such as text layers, gradients, and shape tools, are not implemented, as SAI focuses on drawing and painting, while the final composition is often done using another application. SAI displays white and transparency in the same way, which may cause significant display differences when exporting to another program, such as Adobe Photoshop. There is also no printing functionality, but documents can be exported in a range of popular formats, such as .PSD or .BMP files, in addition to the native .SAI format.

Because the program does not focus on image editing, the only adjustments present are Brightness/Contrast and Hue/Saturation, and therefore no support of level editing, channel extraction, etc. Users may use another program for more complex editing, but when the image is brought back to SAI, its properties may be changed.

SAI also includes linework layers, which can be used instead of manually drawing linework. The linework layer include different tools designed specifically for creating lineart, such as the Line, Curve, Edit, Pressure, and Weight tool.

Customization
Various settings and features can be accessed and edited by the user either from the built-in Options dialog, or using the provided misc.ini file in the installation folder which allows additional options and customization. Existing brush presets can be edited, and the user has the choice of adding custom ones by placing bitmap files into the "elemap" folder. New canvas presets, as well as custom brush textures may be added by the user, in the form of grayscale bitmaps.

References

External links
  
  

Raster graphics editors